Die Männer der Emden ("The Men of the Emden", English title: Odyssey of Heroes) is a 2012 German war adventure film directed and co-written by   that is an account of members of the crew of SMS Emden making their way back to Germany after the Battle of Cocos (1914).  The film was shot in Greece, Sri Lanka, Tunisia, Malta and Germany and appeared as both a miniseries and a feature film.

Plot
The film begins at the Imperial German naval station at the Kiautschou Bay concession in China. Two officers of SMS Emden have a romantic rivalry with Maria von Plettenberg, who lives with her father, mother and sister in Tsingtau.

When war is declared the Emden has a variety of successful naval engagements in the Pacific and Indian oceans.  Soon after a raiding party is sent ashore to destroy a British wireless installation in the Cocos Islands, Emden engages HMAS Sydney but the vessel is sunk with many of the crew captured. Rather than surrender, the shore party seizes the schooner Ayesha and decides to sail back to the Kiautschou Bay concession to fight again.

When the crew arrives in the neutral Dutch East Indies they hear that the concession has been captured by the Japanese. With their fates unknown to each other, the men of Emden and the von Plettenberg family make their way back to Germany.

Cast

Notes

See also
How We Beat the Emden (1915)
Our Emden (1926)
The Exploits of the Emden (1928)
Cruiser Emden (1932)

External links
 

2012 films
2012 television films
2010s adventure drama films
2010s war films
German television films
German historical films
2010s German-language films
German-language television shows
Das Erste original programming
Films set in 1914
Films set in 1915
Films set in 1917
Films set in 1918
German biographical films
War romance films
World War I films based on actual events
World War I naval films
German war films
Films set in Germany
Films set in France
Films set in China
Films set in Papua New Guinea
Films set in Indonesia
Films set in the Indian Ocean
Films set in the Pacific Ocean
Films shot in Germany
Films shot in Greece
Films shot in Tunisia
Films shot in Sri Lanka
Films shot in Malta
2012 drama films
2010s German films